Carlisle Tarleton Perry (March 15, 1893 – October 7, 1953), born "Carlisle Tarleton Lott", was an American Negro league infielder in the 1920s and a manager in the 1940s.

Early life and career
A native of San Antonio, Texas, Perry made his Negro leagues debut in 1920 for the Lincoln Giants. He bounced around with several teams over a five-year career, finishing with the Cleveland Browns in 1924. In 1946, he managed the Los Angeles White Sox. Perry died in Los Angeles, California in 1953 at age 60.

References

Further reading
 Tribune staff (March 13, 1920). "Akron All-Stars Will Reorganize". Oakland Tribune. p. 6
 Tribune staff (April 1, 1920). "Richmond to Open Season Next Sunday; Dietrich Will Take His Elks to San Leandro for the First Game". Oakland Tribune. p. 16
 Courier staff (March 7, 1925). "Former Tate Star and Sox Player Is Alive". The Pittsburgh Courier. p. 7 
 Beacon Journal staff (April 29, 1926). "Cabs to Play White Wings; Conquerors of Firestone Will Meet Up with Russell's Gang Sunday". The Akron Beacon Journal. p. 28 
 Beacon Journal staff (April 22, 1927). "Akron All-Stars Will Reorganize". Akron Beacon Journal. p. 35
 Levette, Harry (August 10, 1934). "Uppercuts and Blocks". Los Angeles Sentinel. p. 7
 Post-Record staff (June 27, 1935). "12 Arrested in Mail Box Robbery of Relief Checks". Los Angeles Evening Post-Record. p. 3
 Eagle staff (June 5, 1936). "Girls Softball League to Open Next Thursday Night". California Eagle. p. 11
 Eagle staff (January 6, 1937). "Carlisle Perry Has Newsboys' Dinner". California Eagle. p. 2
 Chappell, Helen F. (February 24, 1938). "Chatter and...Some News". California Eagle. p. 8
 Eagle staff (October 16, 1941). "Wm. Perry Dead in Oregon. California Eagle. p. 7
 Sentinel staff (March 21, 1946). "Carlisle Perry, L.A. Ball Club to Play in San Diego". Los Angeles Sentinel. p. 23
 Chronicle staff (March 23, 1946). "West Coast League Nines Start Drills". Michigan Chronicle. p. 15 
 Sentinel staff (March 18, 1948). "Birthday Just Another Day to Sell Papers". Los Angeles Sentinel. p. 4
 Sentinel staff (June 17, 1948). "Fight Opinions". Los Angeles Sentinel. p. 21
 Wave staff (February 24, 1949). "Tenants Sue House Owners; Assert Overcharges, Demand Big Refunds". The Southwest Wave. p. 2
 "Advertisement". The Militant. October 17, 1949. p. 4
 Sentinel staff (February 19, 1953). "Texas Diamond School Outstanding Project". Los Angeles Sentinel. p. B4
 Sentinel staff (October 22, 1953). "Mourned". Los Angeles Sentinel. p. 6B

External links
 and Baseball-Reference Black Baseball stats and Seamheads

1893 births
1953 deaths
Bacharach Giants players
Baltimore Black Sox players
Cleveland Browns (baseball) players
Cleveland Tate Stars players
Detroit Stars players
Indianapolis ABCs players
Lincoln Giants players
Washington Potomacs players
Negro league baseball managers
20th-century African-American sportspeople